Kvalvåg is a village in Kristiansund Municipality in Møre og Romsdal county, Norway.

References

Villages in Møre og Romsdal
Kristiansund